Uruguay is a petroleum-importing country, and most of the industry is controlled by the state owned industry ANCAP. ANCAP operates both the only refinery in Uruguay, La Teja Refinery and the distribution of gas within the country.

History 
For decades, Uruguay has been searching for petroleum reserves on its territory. One of the first such attempts was in 1957, when ANCAP drilled in the north of the country.

In 2012, Uruguay engaged on a bidding process for the exploration of hydrocarbons. The following companies are interested: BP, BG Group, Total S.A., Bahamas Petroleum Company and Tullow Oil. Exploration efforts were made in offshore platforms, with an investment of over $1.6 billion in 3 years.

Issues

Leaded gasoline 
Leaded gasoline was phased out in the country in 2003.

La Teja Refinery

References

External links 
 Petroleum system model for Uruguay
 Evaluation of the petroleum systems of Uruguay, by Ed Jarvis and Rob Crossley